Britt Black is a Canadian rock musician. Her song "Night Time" was included in the game Scarface: The World Is Yours soundtrack.

Career

Early years and LiveonRelease
Black's musical career began at the age of ten when she co-wrote with pop rock artist Bif Naked for the track "Violence", released on Lava/Atlantic. At the age of fourteen Britt founded the all female teen group LiveonRelease. The band was signed to AOL Time Warner where it released two albums, Seeing Red and Goes on a Field Trip. The success of these records landed the band on international showcases, along with starting a blitz on Canada's media including several high rotation music videos and spots on national TV and radio shows. The band's premier single "I'm Afraid of Britney Spears" was featured on the soundtrack for the movie Dude, Where's My Car?. When LiveonRelease eventually broke up, Black was quickly taken on by Bif Naked to perform as lead guitarist.

Solo career and other projects
Black released her first solo album, Blackout, in Canada in 2005 and in America on July 25, 2006 through Bodog Music/Sony/Red. That summer, she was on the Vans Warped Tour. At the end of 2007, Britt Black announced on her MySpace page that she was taking a break from touring to write and record her second album.

In February 2008, she also announced on her MySpace that she was developing a new band. The name of the new band was Stay Beautiful, and featured Britt Black and Marcus Ireland on lead vocals. In March 2009, Black announced on MySpace that she would be playing guitar in Lillix. In April 2010, Lillix announced on their website that she had left the band "as of winter 2009."
Black is currently owner of Brittin.Scissor.Hands and is a Hair Stylist at Clear Hair Studio in Vancouver, BC. 
When asked if she still plays music, she replied "Never again".

Personal life
Black is owner of Brittin.Scissor.Hands and is a Hair Stylist at Clear Hair Studio in Vancouver, BC. 
As of 2015, Black is a hairstylist in the film industry. 
As of 2016, Black is married to Former front man of Chinatown and The Lifetakers, Marcus Ireland.
Black is also known as Brittin Ireland.

Equipment
Fender Stratocaster with Seymour Duncan humbuckers
Marshall JCM 2000 full-stack
Dunlop Tortex 1.0mm picks and Ernie Ball strings, gauged .011-.052
pod - Amp Farm amplifier-modeling software plug-in for Pro Tools (for recording)
57' Les Paul Junior historic re-issue with P-90 handwound pickups

Band
Britt Black - Lead Vocals, Guitar

Ex-Members
David Dandy - Guitar, Backup Vocals
Daryl Hood - Drums
Howard Humenick - Bass

Singles

External links
 Interview
 Interview for Guitar Player Magazine - Interview and equipment information.
 Official Britt Black MySpace page 
 Stay Beautiful Official Myspace
 Interview

Canadian rock musicians
Living people
Canadian rock guitarists
Canadian women guitarists
Canadian women rock singers
Canadian hairdressers
21st-century Canadian women singers
21st-century Canadian guitarists
Year of birth missing (living people)
21st-century women guitarists